The Mexico women's national ice hockey team is the women's national ice hockey team of Mexico. They are controlled by the Mexico Ice Hockey Federation, a member of the International Ice Hockey Federation.

History
The Mexico women's national ice hockey team played its first game in March 2012 against Argentina in an exhibition game being held in Cuautitlán Izcalli, Mexico. Mexico lost the game 0–1. The following day they played their second of two exhibition matches against the Argentinian women's national team in Lerma, Mexico, which they won 7–1. The team is controlled by the Mexico Ice Hockey Federation. Forward Claudia Tellez was claimed by the Calgary Inferno in the 2016 CWHL Draft.

World Championships record
2014 – Finished in 33rd place (1st in Division IIB Q)
2015 – Finished in 28th place (2nd in Division IIB)
2016 – Finished in 30th place (4th in Division IIB)
2017 – Finished in 27th place (1st in Division IIB)
2018 – Finished in 27th place (6th in Division IIA)
2019 – Finished in 26th place (4th in Division IIA)
2020 – Cancelled due to the COVID-19 pandemic
2021 – Cancelled due to the COVID-19 pandemic
2022 – Finished in 26th place (5th in Division IIA)

References

External links
IIHF profile
National Teams of Ice Hockey

Ice hockey in Mexico
Women's national ice hockey teams
Ice hockey
National ice hockey teams in the Americas